The 11th Asian Championships in Athletics were held in late September 1995 in Jakarta, Indonesia.

Medal summary

Men's events

Women's events

Medal table

References
GBR Athletics

Asian Athletics Championships
Asian Athletics Championships
Asian Athletics Championships
Asian Athletics Championships
Sport in Jakarta
International athletics competitions hosted by Indonesia